George Summers (born 30 July 1941) is a Scottish retired professional football forward, manager and coach who played in the Football League for Brentford. He later moved to South Africa.

Playing career

Brentford 
Summers began his career in Glasgow at junior club Shawfield Juniors and moved to England to sign for Third Division South club Brentford in January 1959, who were at the time managed by Scot Malky McDonald. With George Francis and Jim Towers ahead of him in the pecking order up front, Summers initially played for the reserve team. He failed to make a first team appearance during the remainder of the 1958–59 season and failed to receive a call at all during the 1959–60 season. Summers finally made his professional debut, nearly two years after signing, in a 4–3 League Cup second round victory over Sunderland at Griffin Park on 25 October 1960. He made something of a breakthrough into the first team during what remained of the 1960–61 season and made a total of 16 appearances, scoring six goals.

The departures of Towers and Francis during the 1961 off-season (though Francis would soon return) saw a space open up in the Bees' forward line alongside new signing Johnny Brooks and Summers got his chance. He made 35 appearances and scored eight goals during the 1961–62 season, at the end of which the club suffered relegation to the Fourth Division. The acquisition of new forwards Billy McAdams and John Dick pushed Summers back into the reserves for the 1962–63 season, but he still managed six goals in 15 league games and claimed the first silverware of his career, when Brentford returned to the Third Division as Fourth Division champions.

Summers was mostly confined to the reserves during the 1963–64 and 1964–65 and made just 12 first team appearances, though he did enjoy some success with the reserves, by winning the London Challenge Cup in 1965 and scoring in the final versus Chelsea. Not in favour with new manager Tommy Cavanagh, Summers was released towards the end of the 1964–65 season. Despite never breaking into the first team, Summers scored 27 goals in 79 appearances in his six years at Griffin Park, an average of one goal every three games.

Port Elizabeth City 
Summers moved to South Africa to link up with former Brentford teammates Matt Crowe and George McLeod at National Football League club Port Elizabeth City in 1965. He remained with the club for three years and was a part of its most successful period, finishing as National Football League runners-up in 1966 and winning the title in 1967.

Johannesburg Corinthians 
Summers joined fellow National Football League club Johannesburg Corinthians in 1968 and stayed with the club for one season.

Managerial and coaching career 
Summers managed South African club Hume Park in the early 1980s and coached the Eastern Province representative team under managers Colin Trader and Daan van der Mescht, helping the club to win the football edition of the Currie Cup in 1981 and 1982.

Honours 
Brentford
Football League Fourth Division: 1962–63
 London Challenge Cup: 1964–65
Port Elizabeth City
 National Football League: 1967

Career statistics

References

1941 births
Footballers from Glasgow
Scottish footballers
Brentford F.C. players
National Football League (South Africa) players
English Football League players
Scottish football managers
Association football forwards
Scottish expatriate footballers
Scottish expatriate football managers
Scottish expatriate sportspeople in South Africa
Expatriate soccer players in South Africa
Living people
Scottish Junior Football Association players
Shawfield F.C. players
Scottish emigrants to South Africa
Corinthians F.C. (Johannesburg) players